Joseph Utay (May 2, 1887 – November 24, 1977) was an American football player, coach, and college athletics administrator.  In 1914, he helped found the Southwest Conference.  He was elected to the College Football Hall of Fame in 1974. On November 4, 2012, Utay was also inducted into the University of Dallas Athletics Hall of Fame. In 1909, Utay led Holy Trinity College to a 7–1–1 season and the championship of the North Texas Interscholastic Association. In his tutelage coaching football at Holy Trinity College, his teams compiled a 15–7–1 record.

References

External links
 
 

1887 births
1977 deaths
American football halfbacks
Dallas Hilltoppers football coaches
Texas A&M Aggies athletic directors
Texas A&M Aggies football coaches
Texas A&M Aggies football players
College Football Hall of Fame inductees
Coaches of American football from Texas
Players of American football from Dallas
Players of American football from St. Louis